Two-letter country codes are used to represent countries and states (often both widely recognized and not) as a code of two letters.

 ISO 3166-1 alpha-2 is the main set of two-letter country codes that is currently used. This standard set of codes is a part of ISO 3166-1, also maintains a list of three-letter codes for countries (ISO 3166-1 alpha-3).
 International vehicle registration codes are either two or three letters.
 The United States Federal Information Processing Standard maintained a separate set of two-letter codes for countries until 2008.